Charlie Allan may refer to:

Charlie Allan (journalist) (born 1958), Scottish sports editor and sports writer
Charlie Allan (musician) (born 1963), Scottish actor and musician

See also
Charles Allan (born 1910), English footballer
Charles Allen (disambiguation)
Charlie Allen (disambiguation)